Abhinn Shyam Gupta (born 22 October 1979 in Allahabad) is a male badminton player from India. Presently he lives in City of Allahabad and is a former national champion in singles. Gupta played badminton at the 2004 Summer Olympics in men's singles, losing in the round of 32 to Park Tae-sang of South Korea. He had been coached by Malik Shamim Sultan.

Gupta received Arjuna Award for his contribution to the Indian badminton. He is also a proud recipient of Honoured Birla Award (1996), Laxman Award (2000) and Yash Bharti Award (2015).

Education and profession

Abhinn is graduate in B.Com. from Allahabad University, Allahabad. Currently, he is employed with Indian Oil Corporation Limited, Allahabad as a Sr. Manager.

Records
Abhinn is a Limca book record holder in 2004. He is the first shuttler of India who becomes national champion in all the categories viz., mini, sub-junior, junior (twice), and senior (twice).

Major participation

Common Wealth Games-Kualalampur – 1998 
World Championship-Copenhagen – 1999
French Super Series 2001 - Winner
Seville – 2001
Manchester – 2002
Asian Games-Busan – 2002 
Birmingham – 2003
World Olympics-Athens Olympic – 2004
U.S.A. (Qualified for the World Championship) – 2005

Achievements

South Asian Games

IBF International

References

External links
 

1979 births
Living people
Indian male badminton players
Indian national badminton champions
Commonwealth Games medallists in badminton
Commonwealth Games silver medallists for India
Badminton players at the 1998 Commonwealth Games
Badminton players at the 2002 Commonwealth Games
Badminton players at the 2002 Asian Games
Badminton players at the 2004 Summer Olympics
Racket sportspeople from Uttar Pradesh
Recipients of the Arjuna Award
Sportspeople from Allahabad
Asian Games competitors for India
Olympic badminton players of India
South Asian Games gold medalists for India
South Asian Games silver medalists for India
South Asian Games medalists in badminton
Medallists at the 1998 Commonwealth Games